Boscobel Airport , also known as Boscobel Municipal Airport, is a city owned public use airport located two nautical miles (4 km) northeast of the central business district of Boscobel, a city in Grant County, Wisconsin, United States.

It is included in the Federal Aviation Administration (FAA) National Plan of Integrated Airport Systems for 2021–2025, in which it is categorized as a local general aviation facility.

Although most U.S. airports use the same three-letter location identifier for the FAA and IATA, this airport is assigned OVS by the FAA but has no designation from the IATA.

Facilities and aircraft 
It has two asphalt paved runways: 7/25 measuring 5,000 by 75 feet (1,524 by 23 m) and 2/20 measuring 3,656 by 58 ft (1,114 by 18 m).

For the 12-month period ending August 26, 2020, the airport had 12,400 aircraft operations, an average of 34 per day: 97% general aviation, 2% air taxi and 1% military. In January 2023, there were 26 aircraft based at this airport: 23 single-engine and 3 multi-engine.

See also
 List of airports in Wisconsin

References

External links 
Boscobel Airport at Wisconsin DOT Airport Directory

Airports in Wisconsin
Buildings and structures in Grant County, Wisconsin